Kaye Voyce is an Obie Award winning New York City based costume designer known for her extensive Off-Broadway work and her work in Broadway theatres on Significant Other, directed by Trip Cullman, The Real Thing, directed by Sam Gold, starring Ewan McGregor and Maggie Gyllenhaal, and the upcoming revival of Sam Shepard's True West starring Ethan Hawke and Paul Dano.

Early life 

Voyce received her BFA and MFA from New York University Tisch School of the Arts in 1994.

Career

Off-Broadway

Broadway 

Source:

Opera

Awards 

In 2016, Voyce won an Obie Award presented by the American Theatre Wing for sustained excellence in costume design. Previously, she was nominated for a 2004 Lucille Lortel Award, and nominated for both a 2015 and 2016 Henry Hewes Design Award.

References

External links 

 
 
 
Kaye Voyce Costume designer at Operabase
Interview with Kaye Voyce on Luna Gale at the Goodman Theater
The Real Thing: A Conversation with Assistant Director Lee Sunday Evans and Costume Designer Kaye Voyce

Year of birth missing (living people)
Living people
American costume designers
Obie Award recipients
Tisch School of the Arts alumni